Africana may refer to:

In arts and entertainment

Music
 Africana, album by Chaino
 Africana, album by Teresa De Sio
 "Africana", song by Romanian singer Delia Matache

Publications 
 Encyclopedia Africana (1999), a compendium of Africana studies
 Philosophia Africana, a peer-reviewed academic journal of Africana philosophy established in 1998
 Polyglotta Africana, an 1854 study comparing 156 African languages

Other uses
 Africana studies, the study of the histories, politics and cultures of peoples of African origin
 Africana Museum (now MuseuMAfricA), historical museum in Johannesburg, South Africa
 Africana (artifacts), cultural artifacts relating to African history and culture
 Africana (coral), a genus of stony corals in the family Caryophylliidae
 Africana (sheep), a breed of domesticated sheep found in Colombia and Venezuela
 Galinha à Africana, a barbecued chicken dish of Portuguese origin
 Hotel Africana, hotel in Kampala, Uganda
 HMSAS Africana, World War II South African minesweeper

See also
 Africanae (disambiguation)
 Africanis, a group of South African dogs not recognised as a breed
 Africanum
 Africanus (disambiguation)